Tasque is an open source task management application/project, part of the GNOME community. Its name was partially inspired by the French village by the same spelling. "Tasque" in French is pronounced the same as the word "task" is in English. It is released under the MIT License.

As of 2018, Tasque is listed as an unmaintained, archived project.

References

External links
 Tasque at the GNOME site
 Tasque git

Free task management software
GNOME Applications
Software that uses GTK
Free software programmed in C